Matilda Liv Vinberg (born 16 March 2003) is a Swedish footballer who plays as a winger for Hammarby IF in Damallsvenskan and the Sweden national team.

Club career

Enskede IK
Vinberg started to play youth football with local club Enskede IK at age seven. In 2018, at age 15, she made her senior debut for the side in Division 1, Sweden's third tier. In three seasons with the club, Vinberg scored 18 goals in 33 league appearances.

Hammarby IF
On 8 January 2021, Vinberg signed a two-year contract with Hammarby IF in Damallsvenskan. Throughout her debut season, she made 17 league appearances, scoring two goals, helping her side to a 7th place in table. In November, Vinberg signed a new two-year deal with the club.
 
In 2022, Vinberg featured in all 26 league games, scoring three goals, as Hammarby finished 5th in the table. At the end of the season, she won the prize of Breakthrough Player of the Year in Damallsvenskan. Vinberg was also voted Hammarby Player of the Year by the supporters of the club.

International career
After making numerous youth appearances, Vinberg made her debut for the Swedish national team on 12 November 2022, coming on as a substitute in a 0–4 loss against Australia in an away friendly. A few months earlier, in September, she had previously been invited to train with the Swedish senior squad by manager Peter Gerhardsson.

References

2003 births
Living people
Swedish women's footballers
Women's association football midfielders
Hammarby Fotboll (women) players
Damallsvenskan players
Sweden women's international footballers